The Teme-Augama Anishnabai (from the Anishinaabe Dimii'aagamaa Anishinaabe, "the deep water people") is the Indigenous Anishinaabe community of the Temagami First Nation. The Teme-Augama Anishnabai have trapped and hunted animals in the Temagami region of Canada for over 5,000 years. Bear Island on Lake Temagami is home to the Aboriginal community.

Land claims 
In 1973, The Teme-Augama Anishnabai exercised a land caution against development on the Crown land of 10,000 square kilometres-most of the Temagami area. The attorney-general of Ontario pursued legal action against the Band for this caution. The Teme-Augama Anishnabai lost this court case in 1984 and proceeded with an appeal to the Supreme Court. 
 
In 1988, the Ontario Minister of Natural Resources, Vince Kerrio approved the expansion of the Red Squirrel logging road, directly through Anishinaabe territory. This prompted a series of roadblocks by the Teme-Augama Anishnabai and by environmentalists in 1988-1989.

In 1991, the Teme-Augama Anishnabai and the Ontario Government created the Wendaban Stewardship Authority to manage the four counties near the logging road. The committee eventually dissolved.

In August 1991, the Teme-Augama Anishnabai lost the land caution appeal and in 1994 eventually the caution was lifted.

Leadership 
In July 2017, the Teme-Augama Anishnabai Council consisted of the following people: Chief Randy Becker, Second Chief John Turner, Councillors: Michael Paul, Tessa Hope, Melissa Turner, Mary Laronde.

Notable people 
 Gary Potts, former chief.
 Ignace Tonené, former chief.

References

See also
White Bear Forest
First Nations in Ontario
Temagami
Anishinaabe peoples